Aseroe floriformis is a species of fungus in the stinkhorn family Phallaceae. Described as a new species in 2005, it is known only from northeast Brazil, where it grows on sandy soil. The fruit body has a raspberry-colored stipe, and, unlike other members of the genus Aseroe does not have radiating branches.

Discovery
The fungus was found during collecting expeditions to the Parque Estadual Dunas do Natal and Reserva Particular do Patrimonio Natural Mata Estrela, in the Brazilian State of Rio Grande do Norte. In 2009, it was reported in the state of Bahia. The specific epithet floriformis refers to the mushroom's resemblance to a flower.

Description
Immature fruit bodies start out as roughly spherical "eggs",  in diameter, on or near the surface of the ground. The eggs are white to yellowish, with robust white mycelial cords. The volva is made of an internal, hyaline (translucent), gelatinous layer as well as a membranous structure that is made of branching, hyaline, septate hyphae measuring 3–7 μm in diameter. It has a pseudoparenchymatous structure (compactly interwoven short-celled filaments that resemble the parenchyma of higher plants) made of spherical cells that are 12–45 μm diameter that contain intracellular pigment. The fruit body has the same pseudoparenchymatous cellular morphology. It is sunflower-shaped, pinkish,  in diameter, with a perforated central disc that has a reddish edge. It does not have any branches or any vestiges of them, unlike other Aseroe species. It is covered by the gelatinous grayish-brown gleba. The spores are cylindrical to ellipsoid, 4–6 by 1.5–2 μm, smooth, and hyaline. The fruit body, when fresh, smells similar to cow dung. This fetid odor is common to stinkhorn fungi, and attracts insects that help to disperse the spores.

References

Phallales
Fungi of Brazil
Fungi described in 2005